Ancient Greek comedy was one of the final three principal dramatic forms in the theatre of classical Greece (the others being tragedy and the satyr play). Athenian comedy is conventionally divided into three periods: Old Comedy, Middle Comedy, and New Comedy. Old Comedy survives today largely in the form of the eleven surviving plays of Aristophanes;  Middle Comedy is largely lost, i.e. preserved only in relatively short fragments by authors such as Athenaeus of Naucratis; and New Comedy is known primarily from the substantial papyrus fragments of Menander.

The philosopher Aristotle wrote in his Poetics (c. 335 BC) that comedy is a representation of laughable people and involves some kind of blunder or ugliness which does not cause pain or disaster. C. A. Trypanis wrote that comedy is the last of the great species of poetry Greece gave to the world.

Periods
The Alexandrine grammarians, and most likely Aristophanes of Byzantium in particular, seem to have been the first to divide Greek comedy into what became the canonical three periods: Old Comedy (ἀρχαία archaia), Middle Comedy (μέση mese) and New Comedy (νέα nea). These divisions appear to be largely arbitrary, and ancient comedy almost certainly developed constantly over the years.

Old Comedy (archaia)

The most important Old Comic dramatist is Aristophanes (born in 446 BC). His works, with their pungent political satire and abundance of sexual and scatological innuendo, effectively define the genre today. Aristophanes lampooned the most important personalities and institutions of his day, as can be seen, for example, in his buffoonish portrayal of Socrates in The Clouds, and in his racy anti-war farce Lysistrata. He was one of a large number of comic poets working in Athens in the late 5th century, his most important contemporary rivals being Hermippus and Eupolis.

The Old Comedy subsequently influenced later European writers such as Rabelais, Cervantes, Swift, and Voltaire. In particular, they copied the technique of disguising a political attack as buffoonery.

Middle Comedy (mese)

The line between Old and Middle Comedy is not clearly marked chronologically, Aristophanes and others of the latest writers of the Old Comedy being sometimes regarded as the earliest Middle Comic poets. For ancient scholars, the term may have meant little more than "later than Aristophanes and his contemporaries, but earlier than Menander". Middle Comedy is generally seen as differing from Old Comedy in three essential particulars: the role of the chorus was diminished to the point where it had no influence on the plot; public characters were not impersonated or personified onstage; and the objects of ridicule were general rather than personal, literary rather than political. For at least a time, mythological burlesque was popular among the Middle Comic poets. Stock characters of all sorts also emerge: courtesans, parasites, revellers, philosophers, boastful soldiers, and especially the conceited cook with his parade of culinary science.

Because no complete Middle Comic plays have been preserved, it is impossible to offer any real assessment of their literary value or "genius". But many Middle Comic plays appear to have been revived in Sicily and Magna Graecia in this period, suggesting that they had considerable widespread literary and social influence.

New Comedy (nea)

New Comedy followed the death of Alexander the Great in 323 BC and lasted throughout the reign of the Macedonian rulers, ending about 260 BC. It is comparable to situation comedy and comedy of manners.
The three best-known playwrights belonging to this genre are Menander, Philemon, and Diphilus.

The playwrights of the New Comedy genre built on the legacy from their predecessors, but adapted it to the portrayal of everyday life, rather than of public affairs. The satirical and farcical element which featured so strongly in Aristophanes' comedies was increasingly abandoned, the de-emphasis of the grotesque—whether in the form of choruses, humour or spectacle—opening the way for greater representation of daily life and the foibles of recognisable character types.

Apart from Diphilus, the New Comedians preferred the everyday world to mythological themes, coincidences to miracles or metamorphoses; and they peopled this world with a whole series of semi-realistic, if somewhat stereotypical figures, who would become the stock characters of Western comedy: braggarts, the permissive father figure and the stern father (senex iratus), young lovers, parasites, kind-hearted prostitutes, and cunning servants. Their largely gentle comedy of manners drew on a vast array of dramatic devices, characters and situations their predecessors had developed: prologues to shape the audience's understanding of events, messengers' speeches to announce offstage action, descriptions of feasts, the complications of love, sudden recognitions, ex machina endings were all established techniques which playwrights exploited and evoked.  The new comedy depicted Athenian society and the social morality of the period, presenting it in attractive colors but making no attempt to criticize or improve it.

In his own time, Philemon was perhaps the most successful among the New Comedy, regularly beating the younger figure of Menander in contests; but the latter would be the most highly esteemed by subsequent generations. Menander's comedies not only provided their audience with a brief respite from reality, but also gave audiences an accurate, if not greatly detailed, picture of life, leading an ancient critic to ask if life influenced Menander in the writing of his plays or if the case was vice versa. Unlike earlier predecessors, Menander's comedies tended to centre on the fears and foibles of the ordinary man, his personal relationships, family life and social mishaps rather than politics and public life. His plays were also much less satirical than preceding comedies, being marked by a gentle, urbane tone, a taste for good temper and good manners (if not necessarily for good morals).

The human dimension of his characters was one of the strengths of Menander's plays, and perhaps his greatest legacy, through his use of these fairly stereotype characters to comment on human life and depict human folly and absurdity compassionately, with wit and subtlety. An example of the moral reformations he offered (not always convincingly) is Cnemon from Menander's play Dyskolos, whose objections to life suddenly fade after he was rescued from a well. The fact that this character was not necessarily closed to reason makes him a character whom people can relate to.

Philemon's comedies tended to be smarter, and broader in tone, than Menander's; while Diphilus used mythology as well as everyday life in his works. The comedies of both survive only in fragments but their plays were translated and adapted by Plautus.  Examples include Plautus' Asinaria and Rudens. Based on the translation and adaptation of Diphilus' comedies by Plautus, one can conclude that he was skilled in the construction of his plots.

Substantial fragments of New Comedy have survived, but no complete plays.  The most substantially preserved text is the Dyskolos ("Difficult Man, Grouch") by Menander, discovered on a papyrus, and first published in 1958.  The Cairo Codex (found in 1907) also preserves long sections of plays including Epitrepontes ("Men at Arbitration"), Samia ("The Girl from Samos"), and Perikeiromene ("The Girl who had her Hair Shorn").  Much of the rest of our knowledge of New Comedy is derived from the Latin adaptations by Plautus and Terence.

Influence

Horace claimed Menander as a model for his own gentle brand of Roman satire.

The New Comedy influenced much of Western European literature, primarily through Plautus and Terence: in particular the comic drama of Shakespeare and Ben Jonson, Congreve, and Wycherley, and, in France, Molière.

The 5-act structure later to be found in modern plays can first be seen in Menander's comedies. Where in comedies of previous generations there were choral interludes, there was dialogue with song. The action of his plays had breaks, the situations in them were conventional and coincidences were convenient, thus showing the smooth and effective development of his plays.

Much of contemporary romantic and situational comedy descends from the New Comedy sensibility, in particular generational comedies such as All in the Family and Meet the Parents.

Dramatists

Some dramatists overlap into more than one period.

Old Comedy

Middle Comedy

New Comedy

See also
 Competitions (agon) at the Dionysia (mixed audiences) and Lenaia (local Athens audience only) festivals
 Cult of Dionysus
 Phallic processions
 Theatre of Dionysus
 Prolegomena de comoedia

Notes

Sources
 Brown, Andrew. 1998. "Ancient Greece." In The Cambridge Guide to Theatre. Ed. Martin Banham. Cambridge: Cambridge University Press. 441–447. .
 Brockett, Oscar G. and Franklin J. Hildy. 2003. History of the Theatre. Ninth edition, International edition. Boston: Allyn and Bacon. .
 Carlson, Marvin. 1993. Theories of the Theatre: A Historical and Critical Survey from the Greeks to the Present. Expanded ed. Ithaca and London: Cornell University Press. .
 Csapo, Eric, and William J. Slater. 1994. The Context of Ancient Drama. Ann Arbor: University of Michigan Press. .
 Freund, Philip. 2003. The Birth of Theatre. Illustrated ed. Vol 1. of Stage by Stage. London: Peter Owen. .
 Janko, Richard, trans. 1987. Poetics with Tractatus Coislinianus, Reconstruction of Poetics II and the Fragments of the On Poets. By Aristotle. Cambridge: Hackett. .
 Ley, Graham. 2006. A Short Introduction to the Ancient Greek Theater. Rev. ed. Chicago and London: University of Chicago Press .
 Olson, S. Douglas, ed. 2007. Broken Laughter: Select Fragments of Greek Comedy. Oxford: Oxford University Press. .
 Taplin, Oliver. 1993. Comic Angels and Other Approaches to Greek Drama Through Vase-Painting. Oxford: Clarendon Press .
 Trypanis, Constantine Athanasius. 1981. Greek Poetry from Homer to Seferis. Chicago: University of Chicago Press .

Further reading
 Cornford, Francis Macdonald, The Origin of Attic Comedy, Cambridge: University Press, 1934.
 Padilla, Mark William (editor), "Rites of Passage in Ancient Greece: Literature, Religion, Society", Bucknell University Press, 1999. 
 Rozik, Eli, The roots of theatre : rethinking ritual and other theories of origin, Iowa City : University of Iowa Press, 2002.

External links
"Aristotle on Comedy" by Malcolm Heath, University of Leeds.
BBC Radio 4 In Our Time programme on ancient Greek Comedy, Thursday 13 July 2006.